Nguyễn Công Huy (born 19 May 1987 in Thanh Hóa) is a Vietnamese footballer who play as a midfielder for club Bình Định.

References 

1987 births
Vietnamese footballers
Living people
Vietnam international footballers
V.League 1 players
Thanh Hóa FC players
Becamex Binh Duong FC players
Viettel FC players
Association football midfielders